This article shows all participating team squads at the 2003 Women's European Volleyball Championship, in Ankara, Turkey from 20 to 28 September 2003.

Pool A

Head coach:

Head coach:

Head coach:

Head coach:

Head coach:

Head coach:

Pool B

Head coach:

Head coach: Andrzej Niemczyk

Head coach:

Head coach:

Head coach:

Head coach:

References

External links
CEV
Official Site

E
Women's European Volleyball Championships
Volleyball competitions in Turkey
2003 in Turkish women's sport